Sergeant (kersantti in Finnish) is a Swedish (OR6) and Finnish (OR5) military rank above överfurir in Sweden and  alikersantti in Finland; and below översergeant in Sweden and ylikersantti in Finland.

Finland 
Enlisted NCOs usually start from sergeant (OR5), in infantry platoons sergeants may serve as squad leaders (6-8 men), deputy platoon commanders (~30 men) or rarely even a platoon commanders, or at company level as Company Sergeant Majors.
In the Finnish army, conscripts are first trained for 2 months in basic training and about 30% are selected for junior NCO training (aliupseerikoulu or AUK), which lasts 4 months. Upon completion, they are promoted to alikersantti and posted to companies for 6 months as squad leaders. Usually, the best-performing alikersantti in a platoon is promoted to kersantti a few weeks before discharge, and in meantime acts as a deputy platoon commander as well as a squad leader. Like any other rank up to Major/Lieutenant Commander, the rank of sergeant can be achieved in reserve if certain requirements are met. 
Professional NCOs can also hold the rank. In this case, a small sword is added to the insignia to distinguish them from conscript sergeants.

Sweden
Sergeant (OR6) is the basic Specialist Officer rank in the Swedish Armed Forces. Promotion to the rank for professional soldiers requires passing out of the 1.5 year Specialist Officer Course at the Militärhögskolan Halmstad and other centers. The Sergeants are Specialist Officers Skill Level A (Basic) and will typically serve as squad leaders or platoon sergeants. The Sergeant can also be a national serviceman serving in level 7 positions. Civil servants of the Armed Forces belonging to position level 7 wear Sergeant's rank insignia when serving in uniform.

Earlier rank insignia
1910-2009

2009-2019

See also 
 Finnish military ranks
 Military ranks of the Swedish armed forces
 Swedish Armed Forces

References

External links
 Officer Training

Military ranks of Finland
Military insignia
Military ranks of the Swedish Army